Naskapi Nation of Kawawachikamach is a First Nation band government in Quebec, Canada. The members of the band are ethnically Naskapi Innu and speak the Naskapi language. The Naskapi Nation of Kawawachikamach is the only Naskapi band in Quebec; there is another Naskapi band, Mushuau Innu First Nation located in Labrador.

Location
Schefferville is not connected to the North American road network but is accessible by airplane via the Schefferville Airport or by train. Schefferville is the northern terminus of Tshiuetin Rail Transportation, which is partially owned by the Nation, with service to Sept-Îles, Quebec. Somewhat contrary to the names, in Quebec, Terres réservées aux Naskapis are parcels of land set aside for the permanent residence of Naskapi First Nations. Village Naskapi are adjacent to Terres réservées aux Naskapis although its members do not reside there permanently.

Population
, the Nation had a registered population of 793 with 688 people living on their reserve and 105 living off the reserve or on other (non-Kawawachikamach) lands. From Statistics Canada's 2016 Census, 601 people lived on the Kawawachikamach reserve up 2.6% from 586 in 2011 Census. With regards to speaking official languages, 70.3% reported only speaking English while only 1.7% reported speaking only French; 21.5% speak both official languages. 97.5% reported an indigenous language, most often Naskapi. is most spoken in the home.

References

First Nations governments in Quebec
Naskapi